Ensar Baykan (born 22 January 1992) is a Turkish footballer who currently plays for Fethiyespor.

Career
On 6 July 2013, he joined Dardanelspor.

References

External links
 
 
 
 

1992 births
Living people
People from Höxter (district)
Sportspeople from Detmold (region)
Turkish footballers
Turkey youth international footballers
German footballers
German people of Turkish descent
Borussia Dortmund II players
Arminia Bielefeld players
Dardanelspor footballers
2. Bundesliga players
3. Liga players
Association football midfielders
Footballers from North Rhine-Westphalia